Kerim Sebatî (1870–1942) was an Ottoman physician and politician, who was one of the original founders and a member of the Committee of the Ottoman Union, but he soon left when it got transformed into a political organisation by the nationalists.

References 

1870 births
1942 deaths
People from Trabzon
Politicians of the Ottoman Empire
20th-century Turkish physicians
20th-century physicians from the Ottoman Empire